Escapade in Japan is a 1957 American family adventure film. It was directed by Arthur Lubin and starred Teresa Wright, Cameron Mitchell, Jon Provost (who, that same year, began his 7-year tenure as Timmy Martin on the TV show Lassie) and Roger Nakagawa.

It also featured an early (and uncredited) appearance of Clint Eastwood as a pilot.

Plot
After his plane goes down, an American boy is rescued from the sea by a Japanese fisherman and his family. When police arrive in the village, the fisherman's son fears that they have done something wrong. He and the American boy go on the run. They meet interesting people and have many adventures, travelling across the country and eluding the police, who are searching for the American boy.

Cast
 Teresa Wright as Mary Saunders
 Cameron Mitchell as Richard Saunders
 Jon Provost as Tony Saunders
 Roger Nakagawa as Asahiko Tanaka
 Philip Ober as Col. Hargrave
 Kuniko Miyake as Michiko Tanaka
 Susumu Fujita as Kei Tanaka
 Katsuhiko Haida as Capt. Hibino
 Tatsuo Saito as Mr. Fushimi
 Hideko Koshikawa as Dekko
 Urego Egawa as Chief of Kyoto police
 Frank Tokunaga as Farmer
 Clint Eastwood as pilot

Production
The film was announced in May 1956 by RKO, who were expanding their operations. In June, RKO president William Dozier assigned the project to Arthur Lubin to produce and direct. Lubin had just signed a contract with the studio following The First Travelling Saleslady. He left for Tokyo and filming began 1 October.

Roger Nagawara was discovered in the American School in Japan. Jonn Provost was cast as the American boy.

RKO executive Arthur Siteman died of a heart attack while making the film in Japan.

Reception
The Los Angeles Times described it as "a delightful tour through Japan." The New York Times said it was "simple but delightful."

See also
 List of American films of 1957

References

External links
 
 Escapade in Japan at TCMDB
 
 
 Escapade in Japan at BFI
 Escapade in Japan at Letterbox DVD

1957 films
1957 adventure films
Films directed by Arthur Lubin
Films scored by Max Steiner
Films set in Japan
RKO Pictures films
Japan in non-Japanese culture
1950s English-language films
American adventure films
1950s American films